Badvel revenue division is an administrative division located in Kadapa district in the Indian state of Andhra Pradesh. With Badvel as its administrative headquarters, it is one of the four revenue divisions in the district and has 12 mandals under its administration and it is the highest number of mandals in Kadapa district .

History 
In late September 2021, the government of Andhra Pradesh released a draft notification for the formation Badvel revenue division, shortly before the Election Commission of India is set to release bypoll election schedule for Badvel Assembly constituency enforcing the Model Code of Conduct, post which the government may not announce new projects and public initiatives. The revenue division was later formed on 22 December 2021, coinciding with the birthday of Y. S. Jagan Mohan Reddy, the incumbent Chief minister of Andhra Pradesh.

Administration 
Badvel revenue division has its administrative headquarters at Badvel and comprises 12 mandals: Atlur, B. Kodur, Brahmamgari Matham, Badvel, Chapadu, Duvvur, Gopavaram, Kalasapadu, Khajipet, Mydukur, Porumamilla and Sri Avadhutha Kasinayana.

See also 
List of revenue divisions in Andhra Pradesh
List of mandals in Andhra Pradesh
Kadapa district
Jammalamadugu revenue division
Kadapa revenue division
Pulivendula revenue division

References 

Revenue divisions in Kadapa district
2021 establishments in Andhra Pradesh